Leptospermum erubescens, commonly known as the roadside tea tree, is a species of shrub that is endemic to southwest of Western Australia. It has thin, fibrous bark, egg-shaped leaves, small white flowers and woody fruit.

Description
The young stems are thick, have soft hairs at first and spread widely apart from each other. The flowers are borne singly or in pairs on the ends of short shoots that continue to grow after flowering. There are broad, reddish bracts and bracteoles at the base of the flower buds, the bracteoles falling off as the flowers develop. Flowering occurs from July to October and the fruit is a woody capsule  in diameter with the remains of the sepals attached.

Taxonomy
Leptospermum erubescens was first formally described in 1844 by Johannes Conrad Schauer in Lehmann's Plantae Preissianae. The specific epithet (erubescens) is from Latin meaning "reddening" or "blushing", referring to the flowers.

Distribution and habitat
The roadside tea-tree grows on road verges, plains, in gullies and among rocky outcrops in heath and woodland. It is widespread in the Avon Wheatbelt, Coolgardie, Esperance Plains, Geraldton Sandplains, Jarrah Forest, Mallee, Swan Coastal Plain, Warren and Yalgoo biogeographic regions.

Conservation status
This tea-tree is classified as "not threatened" by the Government of Western Australia Department of Parks and Wildlife.

References

erubescens
Endemic flora of Western Australia
Plants described in 1844